Hollywood Girl or Hollywood Girls may refer to:

"Hollywood Girl", a song by Drake Bell from his 2005 album Telegraph (album)
"Holywood Girl", a song by English singer Lee Hutton during the 2011 Dansk Melodi Grand Prix in a bid to represent Denmark in the Eurovision Song Contest
Hollywood Girls, full title Hollywood Girls: Une nouvelle vie en Californie, a French television drama series on NRJ12
"HollywoodGirl", A techno producer and dj from Calgary, Canada, featured on the 2016 Love Parade compilation cd on EME records.
Hollywood Girls Night, American reality television series that aired on the TV Guide Network in 2011-2012